Albert II (born 6 June 1934) is a member of the Belgian royal family who reigned as King of the Belgians from 9 August 1993 to 21 July 2013.

Albert II is the son of King Leopold III and the last living child of Queen Astrid, born a princess of Sweden. He is the younger brother of the late Grand Duchess Joséphine-Charlotte of Luxembourg and King Baudouin, whom he succeeded following Baudouin's death in 1993. He married Donna Paola Ruffo di Calabria (now Queen Paola), with whom he had three children. Albert's eldest son, Philippe, is the current King of the Belgians.

On 3 July 2013, King Albert II attended a midday session of the Belgian cabinet. He then announced that, on 21 July, Belgian National Day, he would abdicate the throne for health reasons. He was succeeded by his son Philippe on 21 July 2013. Albert II was the fourth monarch to abdicate in 2013, following Pope Benedict XVI, Queen Beatrix of the Netherlands, and Emir Hamad bin Khalifa of Qatar. In so doing, he was also the second Belgian monarch to abdicate, following his father Leopold III who abdicated in 1951, albeit under very different circumstances.

Early life 
Prince Albert was born in Stuyvenberg Castle, Brussels, as the second son and youngest child of King Leopold III and his first wife, Princess Astrid of Sweden. He was second in line to the throne at birth, and was given the title Prince of Liège. Queen Astrid died in a car accident on 29 August 1935, in which King Leopold was lightly injured but survived, when Prince Albert was one year old. The King remarried to Mary Lilian Baels (later became Princess of Réthy) in 1941. The couple produced three children: Prince Alexandre, Princess Marie-Christine and Princess Marie-Esméralda (who is also Albert's goddaughter). Albert and his siblings had a close relationship with their stepmother and they called her "Mother".

During World War II, on 10 May 1940, at the time when Belgium was being invaded, Prince Albert, his elder sister Princess Joséphine-Charlotte and his elder brother Prince Baudouin, left the country for France and later Spain. The Prince and the Princess returned to Belgium on 2 August 1940. They continued their studies until 1944, either at Laeken, or at the Castle of Ciergnon in the Ardennes. In June 1944, at the time of the Allied landings, King Leopold, his wife Princess Lilian and the royal children were deported by the Germans to Hirschstein, Germany, and later to Strobl, Austria, where they were liberated by the American Army on 7 May 1945. Owing to the political situation in Belgium, King Leopold and his family moved to the villa "Le Reposoir" in Pregny, Switzerland, when they left Austria in October 1945 and stayed until July 1950. During that time, Prince Albert would continue his education in a secondary school in Geneva. King Leopold III, accompanied by Prince Baudouin and Prince Albert, returned to Belgium on 22 July 1950.

Marriage and family 

In 1958, Albert went to the Vatican to witness the coronation of Pope John XXIII. At a reception at the Belgian Embassy, he met Italian Donna Paola Ruffo di Calabria. Prince Albert proposed marriage to her, to which she accepted. Two months after their meeting, the prince introduced his future wife to his family, and four months later to the press. The couple were married on 2 July 1959, one-and-a-half years before Albert's older brother, the king, got married (a marriage which would prove childless). Albert and Paola have three children, twelve grandchildren and two great-grandchildren. Their children are:

King Philippe (born 15 April 1960 at Belvédère Castle)
Princess Astrid (born 5 June 1962 at Belvédère Castle)
Prince Laurent (born 19 October 1963 at Belvédère Castle)

Delphine Boël 
In 1997, the Belgian satirical magazine Père Ubu reported that the Belgian sculptor Delphine Boël (born in 1968) was King Albert II's extramarital daughter. It took some years for the Belgian mainstream media to report this news. According to Baroness Sybille de Selys Longchamps, the mother of Delphine, she and Albert shared an 18-year-long relationship into which Delphine was born.

In June 2013, Boël summoned the then King and his two older children (the then Duke of Brabant and the Archduchess of Austria-Este) to appear in court. She hoped to use DNA tests to prove that she is the King's daughter. As the King enjoyed complete immunity under the law, Boël decided to summon his elder children as well. The king abdicated the following month, in July 2013. After the King's abdication, Boël abandoned her first suit to introduce a second one only against the former King as he was no longer protected by immunity and the first claim would have been judged according to the situation at the time of the introduction of the claim. 

In March 2017, the Court ruled that her claim was unfounded, and her lawyers said she would take the claim to appeal. On 25 October 2018, the Court of Appeal decided that Delphine Boël is not a descendant of Jacques Boël, and ordered King Albert to undergo DNA testing. His lawyer announced that he would seek further advice about a possible referral to Belgium's Cour de Cassation / Hof van Cassatie. In 2019, the King's lawyer confirmed he would not provide a DNA sample in the case.

On 29 May 2019, it was reported by CNN that Albert II had submitted a DNA sample after a Belgian court ruled on 16 May that he would be fined 5,000 euros for each day that he failed to do so, although he would continue to challenge the ruling, according to his attorney, .

The results of these DNA samples were released on 27 January 2020 by Alain Berenboom, confirming Delphine Boël as Albert II's daughter. Albert II confirmed this on 27 January 2020 in a press release.

"The king will treat all his children as equal," Berenboom said, according to VTM News. "King Albert now has four children."

While it was proven that Boël was his biological daughter, her legal status as a daughter was not recognized until a 1 October 2020 ruling of the Brussels Court of Appeal, which also recognized Boël as a princess of Belgium and granted her the new surname of Saxe-Coburg.

Official role

As the younger brother of the childless King Baudouin, Prince Albert was the heir-presumptive to the throne. Albert's son Philippe was groomed to eventually succeed. On Baudouin's death, Albert was sworn in before parliament, on 9 August 1993, as King of the Belgians.

As King, Albert's duties included representing Belgium at home and abroad on state visits, trade missions, and at high level international meetings as well as taking an interest in Belgian society, culture and enterprise.

In 1984, he set up the Prince Albert Foundation, to promote expertise in foreign trade.

The King had a constitutional role which came into play in 2010–2011 when Belgium's parliament was unable to agree on a government. When the crisis was resolved, Albert swore in the new government.

Albert sparked controversy in his December 2012 Christmas speech by comparing modern "populist movements" with those of the 1930s. This was seen by several political commentators, as well as many Flemish politicians, as aimed implicitly at the large Flemish nationalist party, the N-VA. Bart De Wever, the party's leader, called for the King's role in the formation of Belgian governments to be changed in the wake of this comment since he "could no longer see the monarch as playing the constitutional role of referee."

Abdication
On 3 July 2013, 79-year-old King Albert II attended a midday session of the Belgian cabinet, where he revealed his intention to abdicate to Prime Minister Elio Di Rupo and to the deputy prime ministers. This came less than one month after the king and two of his children had been asked to appear in court by the Belgian sculptor Delphine Boël, who was intent on proving that the king was her biological father. According to a letter sent by the King to the Prime Minister and dated 3 July 2013, and which was made public, the King had already broached the topic of his intention to abdicate several times with the Prime Minister, who had asked him to reconsider it. At 6 PM (CET) the King announced in a recorded radio and television speech that on 21 July, Belgium's National Day, he would abdicate the throne for health reasons. He was succeeded by his elder son, Philippe.

After his abdication on 21 July 2013 it was decided that he would be styled as His Majesty King Albert II, the same form of address granted to his father, Leopold III, after his abdication.

Honours

Argentina: Grand Cross with Collar of the Order of the Liberator General San Martín
Austria: Grand Star of the Decoration of Honour for Services to the Republic of Austria (1958)
Bulgaria: Grand Cross of the Order of the Balkan Mountains (2003)
Cameroon: Grand Cross of the Order of Merit
Colombia: Grand Cross of the Order of Boyaca
Ecuador: Grand Collar of the National Order of San Lorenzo
Estonia: Grand Cross with Collar of the Order of the Cross of Terra Mariana (5 June 2008)
Finland: Grand Cross with Collar of the Order of the White Rose (1996)
Gabon: Grand Cross of the Order of Merit
Vatican: Knight Grand Cross with the Collar of the Order of Pope Pius IX
Iceland: Grand Cross of the Order of the Falcon (16 October 1979)
Italy: Knight Grand Cross of the Order of Merit of the Italian Republic (29 October 1973)
Lithuania: Grand Cross with Collar of the Order of Vytautas the Great (16 March 2006)
Malaysia: Honorary Grand Commander of the Most Esteemed Order of the Defender of the Realm
Mexico: Collar of the Order of the Aztec Eagle
Monaco: Grand Cross of the Order of Saint-Charles, (13 October 1957)
Norway: Grand Cross of the Royal Norwegian Order of St. Olav (1964)
Peru: Grand Cross of the Order of the Sun of Peru, Special Class
Poland: Grand Cross of the Order of Merit of the Republic of Poland
Portugal:
 Grand Cross of the Military Order of Aviz (11 December 1985)
 Grand Collar of the Order of Prince Henry (13 December 1999)
Romania: Collar of the Order of the Star of Romania (2009)
Senegal: Grand Cross of the Order of Merit
South Korea: Grand Gwanghwa Medal (1st Class) of the Order of Diplomatic Service Merit
Spain:
 Knight of the Order of the Golden Fleece (16 September 1994)
 Knight Grand Cross of the Royal and Distinguished Spanish Order of Charles III (15 November 1977)
Tunisia: Grand Cross of the Order of the Republic
Venezuela: Grand Cross with Collar of the Order of the Liberator

Dynastic honours
 Ethiopian Imperial Family: Grand Cordon with Collar of the Imperial Order of the Queen of Sheba

Honorary degrees
King Albert II is Doctor Honoris Causa of:
 the Catholic University of Leuven
 Saint Louis University, Baguio City
 Ghent University
 the Free University of Brussels
 the Catholic university of Mons
 the Polytechnic Faculty of Mons.

Eponym 
 Boulevard du Roi Albert II/Koning Albert II-laan, Brussels.
 Boulevard Prince de Liège /Prins van Luiklaan, Brussels
 Institute King Albert II, University hospital of Saint-Luc.

Arms

Ancestry

See also 
 Line of succession to the Belgian throne
 Crown Council of Belgium
 Royal Trust
 Prince Albert Fund
 Michel Didisheim, former private secretary
 Jacques van Ypersele de Strihou, former chief of the Kings Cabinet.
 Frank De Coninck, (former) Marshal of the Royal Household

Notes

References

External links 

 Biography on the official Belgian monarchy web site

|-

Living people
1934 births
20th-century Belgian monarchs
21st-century Belgian monarchs
20th-century Roman Catholics
21st-century Roman Catholics
Members of the Senate (Belgium)
Roman Catholic monarchs
Belgian monarchs
Belgian Roman Catholics
Belgian people of Swedish descent
House of Belgium
Nobility from Brussels
Princes of Saxe-Coburg and Gotha
Monarchs who abdicated

Recipients of the Grand Cross of the Order of Leopold II
Grand Crosses of the Order of the Crown (Belgium)
Grand Crosses of the Royal Order of the Lion

Grand Crosses of the Order of Aviz
Honorary Knights Grand Cross of the Royal Victorian Order
Grand Collars of the Order of Prince Henry
Grand Crosses of the Order of Saint-Charles
Grand Crosses of the Order of the Dannebrog
Grand Crosses with Chain of the Order of Merit of the Republic of Hungary (civil)
Knights Grand Cross of the Order of Orange-Nassau
Knights Grand Cross of the Order of Saints Maurice and Lazarus
Knights Grand Cross of the Order of the Falcon
Knights of the Golden Fleece of Spain
Knights of the Golden Fleece of Austria
Recipients of the Grand Star of the Decoration for Services to the Republic of Austria
Recipients of the Collar of the Order of the Cross of Terra Mariana
Grand Crosses of the Order of Merit of the Republic of Poland
Bailiffs Grand Cross of Honour and Devotion of the Sovereign Military Order of Malta
Knights of the Holy Sepulchre
Grand Crosses Special Class of the Order of Merit of the Federal Republic of Germany
International Olympic Committee members
House of Saxe-Coburg and Gotha (Belgium)
First Class of the Order of the Star of Romania
Recipients of the Order of the White Eagle (Poland)
Knights Grand Cross with Collar of the Order of Merit of the Italian Republic
Recipients of orders, decorations, and medals of Ethiopia